The Seoul Olympic Stadium, also known as Jamsil Olympic Stadium (formerly romanised as Chamshil), is a multi-purpose stadium in Seoul, South Korea. It is the main stadium built for the 1988 Summer Olympics and the 10th Asian Games in 1986. It is the centrepiece of the Seoul Sports Complex in the Songpa District, in the southeast of the city south of the Han River. It is the largest stadium in South Korea.

Design and construction
This multi-purpose stadium was designed by Kim Swoo-geun. The lines of the stadium's profile imitate the elegant curves of a Korean Joseon Dynasty porcelain vase. Spectator seats are distributed on two tiers, half covered. Initially built with a capacity of approximately 100,000, today it seats 69,950.

Before its construction, Seoul's largest venues were Dongdaemun Stadium and Hyochang Stadium. Seating 30,000 and 20,000 respectively, they were too small to attract world-class sporting events. Construction on the new stadium began in 1977 with the aim of staging the Asian Games in 1986. When Seoul was awarded the Games of the XXIV Olympiad in September 1981, this stadium became the centrepiece.

Sports
Officially, the stadium opened on 29 September 1984 and served as the site for the 10th Asian Games two years later, then the Olympics in 1988. However, it has not been used to stage a major world sporting event since then. It currently has no occupant, although the Korea Football Association has expressed interest in using the stadium for national team matches.

The events hosted by the stadium during the Olympics were the Opening and Closing Ceremonies, athletics, the football finals, and the equestrian jumping individual final.

Football
From the match against Japan on 30 September 1984 to the match against Yugoslavia on 28 May 2000, the Olympic Stadium was the home ground of the Korea Republic national football team. The newly built Seoul World Cup Stadium then became the center match venue for the Korean team. In an effort to revitalize football across the nation, Korea used the Olympic Stadium for the 2013 EAFF East Asian Cup in a 1–2 losing match against Japan on 28 July 2013. The KFA has expressed interest in continuing to use the venue for future national team matches.

Since 2015, newly formed professional football club Seoul E-Land FC is using this stadium.

Auto racing
The Seoul ePrix had the circuit run over into the Stadium and around the Seoul Sports Complex.

List of concerts

Notes

References

External links

 Seoul Sports Facilities Management Center 

Buildings and structures in Songpa District
Seoul
Athletics (track and field) venues in South Korea
Sports venues in Seoul
Football venues in South Korea
Korea, South
Venues of the 1986 Asian Games
Asian Games athletics venues
Asian Games football venues
Venues of the 1988 Summer Olympics
Olympic athletics venues
Olympic equestrian venues
Olympic football venues
Stadiums of the Asian Games
Seoul E-Land FC
Multi-purpose stadiums in South Korea
Sports venues completed in 1984
1984 establishments in South Korea
K League 2 stadiums
20th-century architecture in South Korea